Alphen aan den Rijn (or "Alphen on the Rhine") is a city and municipality in the western Netherlands, in the province of South Holland. The city is situated on the banks of the river Oude Rijn (Old Rhine), where the river Gouwe branches off.

The municipality of Alphen aan den Rijn also includes the communities of Aarlanderveen, Zwammerdam, and Boskoop.  The city is located in what is called the 'Green Heart' of the Netherlands, which is a somewhat less densely populated centre area of the Randstad.

The name "Alphen" is probably derived from the name of the Roman fort Albaniana, meaning "settlement at the white water". Its remains still lie underneath the city centre.

History 
 
The area around Alphen aan den Rijn has been inhabited for 2000 years. In the Roman era, the Oude Rijn was the main branch of the Rhine River and formed the north border of the Roman Empire. Since the rule of Emperor Claudius (41–54 AD), divisions of the Roman army were stationed here. Consequently, several Roman fortifications were located along the Oude Rijn, including castellum Albanianae in the centre of Alphen. The Romans had also built the first bridge over the Oude Rijn. Alphen was therefore an important commercial site in the area until Germanic raids ended that in 240 AD.

After recurring problems with flooding, especially in Utrecht and Leiden, the Oude Rijn was dammed at Wijk bij Duurstede in 1122, thereby making the Lek River the main branch of the Rhine. The Oude Rijn has not flooded since. During the Middle Ages, Alphen was a fiefdom called Alphen en Rietveld.

In the 17th century, Alphen became prominent again as a hub for commerce. The Oude Rijn was used for boat traffic; there are still portions along the river where the towpath is present.

The current municipality was formed in 1918 through the amalgamation of the smaller municipalities of Alphen, Aarlanderveen, and Oudshoorn. In 1964, the municipality of Zwammerdam was added as well. In 2014 the municipalities of Boskoop and Rijnwoude were amalgamated as well, doubling the land area and increasing the population to over 100,000.

During the Second World War, the majority of Jews from Alphen were deported and subsequently murdered; only a few survived. After the war, the Jewish congregation was disbanded and merged with the one in Leiden. A Jewish cemetery on the Aarkade was founded in 1802, but it was abandoned and razed in the 1960s, with the remains re-interred in Katwijk; in 2012, after fifteen years of community activism by local historian Anke Bakker and CDA council member Alice Besseling, a monument was installed and the area turned into a city park.

Since the 1950s, the city began to grow rapidly. A large new neighbourhood was built on the north side and Alphen became mostly a commuter city. Other urban developments however did create local employment. Since the 1990s, a similar new development was built at the city's south side.

In recent years, a large part of the city centre has undergone a full urban renewal. Many buildings from the 1950s and earlier have been demolished to make place for modern architecture. This "masterplan" included the addition of a new public square next to the riverbank, the construction of a performing arts theatre/cinema, an upgrade of local shops and the creation of pedestrian streets. As of 2006, all of these projects on the left riverbank Hoge Zijde have been finished and a new similar masterplan for the right riverbank Lage Zijde has been developed and is being executed now.

On 9 April 2011, a gunman opened fire at a shopping centre in Alphen aan den Rijn, killing six people and subsequently taking his own life.

On 3 August 2015, a newly built bridge flap of the under-renovation Juliana Bridge on the Oude Rijn collapsed. It was being hoisted by two cranes, different in size, floating on a pontoon that was not stabilized. It became unbalanced shortly after the lifting started, fell and collapsed onto buildings. There were no injuries and fatalities, many inhabitants having already cleared the area. In total 51 properties were damaged.

Demographics
 Native Dutch people: 78,8%
 Other European people and second-generation descendants: 9,5%
 Turkish people: 1.3%
 Moroccan people: 2.7%
 Surinamese people: 1.8%
 People from the Netherlands Antilles and Aruba: 0.9
 Other non-natives: 5%

Tourism
Alphen aan den Rijn has the following attractions:
Avifauna Bird Park – the world's first dedicated bird park, opened in 1950.
Archeon – an archeological park about Dutch History, with ruins and reenactments, including 43 replica buildings from prehistoric, Roman, and Medieval eras. It opened in 1994.
Zegersloot Recreation Park – park with an artificial lake, popular for hiking, cycling, windsurfing, wakeboarding and water skiing.

Events
 20 van Alphen – International 20 kilometres run. Held every year (since 1952) on the second Sunday of March. The 2006 event was marked by a world record when Haile Gebrselassie posted a time of 1 hour 11 minutes 37 seconds for 25 km.  This was his 22nd world record breaking performance.
 Year market – third Wednesday in September. Regional products.
 Lakeside Festival – end of August. Music festival near Zegersloot.
 Old timer day – second Saturday of September. Old cars, tractors, steam engines.
 LAURA – four-day bicycle event Leiden, Amsterdam, Utrecht, Rotterdam and Alphen aan den Rijn which is the start and finish place, is held the first week of July.
 Tean International – Challenger level ATP Tour tennis tournament, played at the Alphense Tennis Club, from 30 August to 8 September 2008.
 Midwinter Fair and Midzomer Fair – Fantasy festivals at the Archeon.
 Vakantiespel – One of the largest events for children between 6 and 12-year-old in the Netherlands. Held every year in August.

Public transport

The town is served by Alphen aan den Rijn railway station. It is just south east of the town centre. The bus station is located near the railway station. Trains which head towards Alphen aan den Rijn railway station are notorious for not always opening their doors to passengers.

Politics
In total, there are 11 parties in the city council that consists of 35 councillors. Liesbeth Spies of the CDA is the current acting mayor. The council of mayor and alderman run the city on a day-to-day basis and report to the city council.

Current (2016) aldermen in Alphen aan den Rijn are:
 M.H. du Chatinier (ChristenUnie)
 C.J. van Velzen (CDA)
 G. van As (Nieuw Elan)
 T. Hoekstra (VVD)
 H. de Jager (CDA)
 E. de Leest (D66 - since 21-04-2016 instead of W.J. Stegeman)

Economy
The information and publishing company Wolters Kluwer is based in Alphen aan den Rijn.

Notable natives

 Quirijn van Brekelenkam (1622/29 in Zwammerdam – 1669/79), a Dutch Baroque genre painter
 George Pieter Willem Boers (1811 in Hazerswoude – 1884), an East Indies Army colonel and Governor of the Dutch Gold Coast
 J.C. Bloem (1887 Oudshoorn – 1966), a Dutch poet and essayist
 Maartje Offers (1891 in Koudekerk – 1944), a Dutch classical contralto singer
 Lykele Faber (1919 in Koudekerk - 2009), a Dutch resistance commando and radio operator
 Roel van den Broek (born 1931), a Dutch religious scholar and academic
 Matthijs van Heijningen (born 1944), a Dutch film producer
 Bas Eenhoorn (born 1946), a politician and management consultant, Mayor of Alpen 2010–2012
 Harald Prins (born 1951), a Dutch anthropologist, ethnohistorian and filmmaker
 Marian Bakermans-Kranenburg (born 1965), a scientist and academic focused on pedagogy and family relations
 Liesbeth Spies (born 1966), a Dutch politician, Mayor of Alphen aan den Rijn since 2014
 Abid Tounssi (born 1981), stage name Salah Edin, a Dutch Moroccan rapper and actor

Sport 

 Wim Schouten (1878–1941), a sailor, competed at the 1928 Summer Olympics 
 Petrus Wernink (1895 in Oudshoorn – 1971), a sailor, competed at the 1920 Summer Olympics
 Tom Okker (born 1944 in Hazerswoude), a Dutch former tennis player, world No. 3 in 1974
 Dido Havenaar (born 1957 in Hazerswoude), a former Japanese football player with 302 club caps
 Bettine Vriesekoop (born 1961 in Hazerswoude), a former table tennis player 
 Ron van Teylingen (born 1967 in Boskoop) is a sailor, competed at the 1992 and 1996 Summer Olympics
 Hans Nieuwenburg (born 1968 in Koudekerk), a former water polo defender, competed in two Summer Olympics
 Wouter van Pelt (born 1968), a former Dutch field hockey player, with 236 international caps
 Peter van Niekerk (born 1971 in Hazerswoude), a sailor, competed at the 2000 and 2004 Summer Olympics
 Arjan van Heusden (born 1972), a Dutch former football goalkeeper with 206 club caps
 Mark van der Zijden (born 1973 in Boskoop), a former freestyle swimmer, team bronze medallist at the 2000 Summer Olympics
 Evert-Jan 't Hoen (born 1975), a Dutch baseball player, competed in three Summer Olympics
 Wilbert Pennings (born 1975), a Dutch high jumper, competed in the 2000 Summer Olympics
 Jeannette Pennings (born 1977), a Dutch bobsledder and track and field athlete
 Martin Verkerk (born 1978 in Leiderdorp), a retired professional Dutch tennis player
 John Heitinga (born 1983), a Dutch football coach and former player with 324 club caps
 Noël van Klaveren (born 1995), a Dutch artistic gymnast
 Jelle Sels (born 1995), a Dutch tennis player
 Thijs Timmermans (born 1998), a Dutch football player

Gallery

References

External links 

Official website

 
Municipalities of South Holland
Populated places in South Holland
Roman sites in the Netherlands
Germania Inferior
Holocaust locations in the Netherlands